Rip It Up was a bi-monthly New Zealand music magazine that was published from 1977 to 2015.

History and profile
Started in June 1977 as a free monthly giveaway, it grew rapidly, with its monthly print run reaching 30,000 copies by the mid-1980s. The new magazine arrived at an opportune moment, with the musical revolutions of punk rock and new wave arriving in New Zealand in the first few years of its existence - two genres which the new magazine was to champion, alongside local music trends such as the Dunedin sound. For many years it was unequalled as a New Zealand source of information on rock music. The magazine's back-catalogue also provides an unrivalled reference for information about the history of New Zealand's rock music.

The brainchild of Murray Cammick and Alistair Dougal, Rip It Up was circulated free via record shops for fourteen years as a music rag produced on a meagre budget. In 1991 the physical quality of the publication improved, making the transition from newsprint to a gloss medium, a direct result of the NZ$2 charge.

Editors
Murray Cammick was the first editor of the magazine and ran it virtually single-handedly for several years. Other editors have included David Long, now a sports journalist at Fairfax Media, Scott Kara, who later worked for the New Zealand Herald, Martyn "Bomber" Bradbury (radio and television host), who left Rip it Up in 2005, and Phil Bell (AKA DJ Sir-Vere), who left in August 2011 to become the programme director for popular urban radio station Mai FM.

Rip It Up ceased publication in 2015. The archives and the name are owned by Simon Grigg.

References

External links
Rip It Up - official website - @ Archive.org
AudioCulture - history
Digitised issues from 1977–1985 available at Papers Past

1977 establishments in New Zealand
2015 disestablishments in New Zealand
Bi-monthly magazines
Defunct magazines published in New Zealand
Free magazines
Magazines established in 1977
Magazines disestablished in 2015
Mass media in Auckland
Monthly magazines published in New Zealand
Music magazines